Pope's College, is a general degree college located in Sawyerpuram, Thoothukudi district, Tamil Nadu. It was established in the year 1880. The college is affiliated with Manonmaniam Sundaranar University. This college offers different courses in arts, commerce and science.

Departments

Science
Physics
Chemistry
Mathematics
Zoology
Information Technology

Arts and Commerce
Tamil
English
Economics
Post Graduate and Research Department of Economics : The Department of Economics is the leading faculty in the campus of Pope’s college. B.A Degree course was established in 1966 and M.A course was added in 1987. The department has been upgraded as a research institute to run M. Phil and Ph. D courses from the year 2011-12. The department also offers a certificate course on “Dress Designing” for first year students. God has blessed the department abundantly over the years with doctoral degrees in possession of many members of its staff. This is an incredible attainment in the outskirt of M.S. University, Tirunelveli. Pioneer Staff members of the Department : Former staff members and their service records are given as follows: Mr.G.R.Fredrick M.A (Eco)., M.A. (His.) (1962 – 1973); Mr.J.D. Rathnasingh (1968 - 1988); Mr.G Vedamanickam (1967 - 1989); Prof. K. Paul Dawson (1962 – 1970 & (1980 – 1993); Dr. T.Ananda Veda (1967 - 2003); Dr.T.Chibi Chelliah (1980 - 2010). Prof. C. Manickam, the only member in the faculty of History was also seated in the department.
Business Administration
Commerce

Accreditation
The college is  recognized by the University Grants Commission (UGC).

References

External links

Educational institutions established in 1880
1880 establishments in India
Colleges affiliated to Manonmaniam Sundaranar University
Universities and colleges in Thoothukudi district